Mark Prudhoe (born 8 November 1963) is an English former professional footballer who played as a goalkeeper for 17 different Football League clubs.

Career
Prudhoe was born in Washington, County Durham, and began his career with Sunderland and became a typical journeyman footballer. After a loan spell with Hartlepool United Prudhoe had short spells with Birmingham City, Walsall, Doncaster Rovers, Sheffield Wednesday, Grimsby Town, a return to Hartlepool United, Bristol City and Carlisle United. He then joined Darlington in 1989, where he picked up winner's medals for both the Football Conference and the Football League Fourth Division title.

This earned him a moved to Stoke City where he played 38 times in 1993–94, 48 times in 1995–96 and 15 in 1996–97. Whilst at Stoke Prudhoe spent time out on loan at Peterborough United, Liverpool and York City. He then went on to play for Bradford City, a second spell at Darlington, Southend United, a second spell at Bradford and ended his career at Macclesfield Town.

Coaching career
Following his retirement as a player, Prudhoe was appointed goalkeeping coach at Hull City in 2005, and in 2011 returned to Sunderland to coach in their academy.

Career statistics

Honours
Darlington
 Fourth Division: 1990–91
 Football Conference: 1989–90

Individual
PFA Team of the Year: 1992–93 Third Division
 Stoke City Player of the Year: 1995–96

References

External links

Interview with Prudhoe

1963 births
Living people
People from Washington, Tyne and Wear
Footballers from Tyne and Wear
English footballers
Association football goalkeepers
Birmingham City F.C. players
Bradford City A.F.C. players
Bristol City F.C. players
Carlisle United F.C. players
Darlington F.C. players
Doncaster Rovers F.C. players
Grimsby Town F.C. players
Hartlepool United F.C. players
Liverpool F.C. players
Macclesfield Town F.C. players
Peterborough United F.C. players
Sheffield Wednesday F.C. players
Southend United F.C. players
Stoke City F.C. players
Sunderland A.F.C. players
Walsall F.C. players
York City F.C. players
English Football League players
Hull City A.F.C. non-playing staff
Sunderland A.F.C. non-playing staff
Hartlepool United F.C. non-playing staff
Association football coaches
Association football goalkeeping coaches